Chamberlain is a township in the Canadian province of Ontario, located within the Timiskaming District.

The rural township had a population of 332 in the Canada 2016 Census. Its primary named settlements are the communities of Chamberlain, Krugerdorf, and Wabewawa.

History
Nomadic people moved through the area 6,000 to 8,000 years ago.  The area then became home to Algonquin people.

European fur traders passed through the area beginning in the 1600s, likely following the Blanche River which flows through Chamberlain.

The Province of Ontario surveyed large areas to the north and west of Lake Timiskaming in the 1880s, and in 1888 Chamberlain was surveyed into seventy-two  lots.

Land was open for settlement at the head of Lake Timiskaming in 1891, and by 1902-03 settlers had moved into Chamberlain.

The newly constructed, provincially owned Temiskaming and Northern Ontario Railway (now Ontario Northland Railway) ran as far north as New Liskeard.  In 1904, work began to build the railway north from there, through the east side of Chamberlain.  Work trains were clearing the railway right-of-way north of Englehart in 1906.

Between 1905 and 1915, the railway offered free land to settlers.

Chamberlain Township was incorporated in 1908.

Between 1925 and 1927, the province began construction of the Ferguson Highway, a road system to connect North Bay to Cochrane. In Chamberlain, it used the Wawbewawa Road to the Lutheran Church corner, and then followed Chamberlain 5 to the present day Highway 573. It then turned north to Swastika.

Krugerdorf

August Kruger and Louise Mueller, immigrants from Germany, moved with their children to the area from Renfrew County in 1905.  Kruger was 59.

Kruger was attracted to the area by the stone-free farmland, as well as the likelihood of finding land for his 5 sons.  Kruger built a small house and a blacksmith shop.  The Pembroke Deutsche Post reported in 1907 that the Krugers' new homestead comprised .

Kruger and his sons worked on the northern extension of the railway, and a station was built on their property.  In their blacksmith shop they made railway spikes and shod horses.  In time, the Kruger's built a sawmill on the Blanche River, as well as a threshing mill.

Other German-speaking families from the Renfrew area moved to the community, which was called "The German Settlement" until it was named Krugerdorf.  English-speaking settlers from Toronto also settled there.

A Jewish community of about 50 families from Russia and Romania settled in the area, assisted by the Baron de Hirsch Institute of Montreal.  The 'Northern Hebrew Cemetery' was established following the death of 3 settlers in a canoe accident.

Krugerdorf soon had a school, Lutheran church, Church of England, synagogue, 2 stores, gas station, boarding house, post office, railway station, community hall, and gravel pit.

The rich clay soil was suitable for growing crops, though the markets for beef and grain were distant and the growing season was short.  Many farmers worked at lumber camps in winter to earn extra money.

The community began to decline in the 1920s, and a scattering of original buildings remain.

Demographics

Mother tongue (2006) :
 English as first language: 92.5%
 French as first language: 6.0%
 English and French as first language: 0.0%
 Neither English nor French: 1.5%

See also
List of townships in Ontario

References

External links

Municipalities in Timiskaming District
Single-tier municipalities in Ontario
Township municipalities in Ontario